HMS Agincourt (also known as Astute Boat 7) is an  nuclear-powered fleet submarine under construction for the Royal Navy and the seventh in her class. The boat's name was confirmed in May 2018, having previously held the in-work name of Ajax.

The confirmation for the seventh and final Astute-class boat was given in the Strategic Defence and Security Review 2010, although the order was not placed until 2018.

On 11 December 2012 the British government announced that long-lead items had been ordered for boats 6 and 7.

On 6 March 2018 the Defence Procurement minister Guto Bebb confirmed that the MoD had gained Treasury approval to sign a contract for Astute Boat 7, after a leaked Navy document had suggested it might not be procured as a cost-saving measure. In May 2018 it was reported that construction of Boat Seven had begun. She has been projected as being ready for service by early 2026 and will be based at Faslane (HMNB Clyde).

Design

Propulsion
Agincourt’s PWR2 nuclear reactor will not need to be refuelled during the boat's 25-year service. Since the submarine can replenish her air supply and purify water underway and while submerged, she will be able to circumnavigate the planet without resurfacing. The submarine's main limitation will be from the three months supply of food carried for the 98 officers and ratings.

Weapons
Agincourt will have provision for up-to 38 weapons in six  torpedo tubes.

References

External links

Astute-class submarines
Proposed ships of the Royal Navy
Ships built in Barrow-in-Furness